Rinky Dink is a mobile musical sound system that operates on power provided by two bicycles and solar panels. The sound system tours the world as part of many musical festivals and parties. 

As well as being powered by bicycle, the system itself is moved around using specially converted bicycles. Rinky Dink is an example of how green electricity can be generated and used to power things.

The Rinky Dink was responsible for powering the first bicycle-powered digital recording in history—Live & Pedal-Powered (1995) by Baka Beyond.

The system was named after the American slang expression "rinky-dink", which originally meant "rip-off", but came to mean anything that was poorly put together, amateurish, shoddy, cheap or insignificant.

External links
Rinky Dink official site (dead link)
Rinky Dink on Glastonbury Festival website (page not found)
A song by David Rovics about the Rinky Dink

Similar projects
Cycle-powered cinema
Similar, but static bicycle-powered sound system—as seen on Blue Peter
Renewable energy-powered sound systems
High Efficiency high fidelity bike powered events on a large scale

Solar-powered devices
Electronic music groups
DIY culture
Human power